The 31st Hundred Flowers Awards was held on held on September 29, 2012 at Shaoxing, Zhejiang.

Awards and nominations

Best Film

Best Director

Best Screenplay

Best Actor

Best Actress

Best Supporting Actor

Best Supporting Actress

Best Newcomer
{| class="wikitable"
|-
!Winner
!Winning film
!Nominees
|-
|Zhang Zifeng
|Aftershock
|* Li Ai for Go Lala Go! * Li Qin for The Founding of a PartyZhang Zixuan for Love is Not Blind Hu Ge for 1911 
|}

Lifetime Achievement award
Wang Weiyi
Yan Jizhou

Outstanding Film1911 Love is Not Blind''

References

External links

2012